Bleriot Heuyot Tobit (born 27 November 1975 in Yaoundé) is a retired Cameroonian professional footballer. He played for Widzew Łódź, Córdoba CF and the Cameroon national football team at the 1993 FIFA World Youth Championship.

References

External links
 

1975 births
Living people
Cameroonian footballers
Association football forwards
Pogoń Szczecin players
Widzew Łódź players
Lech Poznań players
Córdoba CF players
Ciudad de Murcia footballers
Expatriate footballers in Poland
Cameroonian expatriates in Poland